Bobry is a rural locality (a khutor) in Plotnikovskoye  Rural Settlement, Danilovsky District, Volgograd Oblast, Russia. The population was 226 as of 2010. There are 8 streets.

Geography 
Bobry is located in steppe, on the northwest bank of the Bobrovoye Lake, 21 km west of Danilovka (the district's administrative centre) by road. Lovyagin is the nearest rural locality.

References 

Rural localities in Danilovsky District, Volgograd Oblast